The boys' épée competition at the 2014 Summer Youth Olympics were held in the Nanjing International Expo Center on 18 August.

Results

Pool Round

Pool 1

Pool 2

Bracket

Final standings

References
 Pool results
 Bracket results

Fencing at the 2014 Summer Youth Olympics